Tianshun (15 February 1457 – 26 January 1465) was the era name used by Emperor Yingzong, the sixth emperor of the Ming dynasty of China, after he ascended the throne for the second time. It was used for a total of eight years.

On 11 February 1457 (Jingtai 8, 17th day of the 1st month), Emperor Yingzong was restored to the throne, and on 15 February the same year (21st day of the 1st month), the era was changed to Tianshun. On 28 February 1464 (Tianshun 8, 22nd day of the 1st month), the Chenghua Emperor ascended to the throne and continued to use. The era was changed to Chenghua in the following year.

Comparison table

Other regime era names that existed during the same period
 China
 Tianyuan (添元, 1453–1457): Oirats — era name of Esen
 Tianxiu (天繡, 1457): Ming period — era name of Wang Bin (王斌)
 Wulie (武烈, 1460): Ming period — era name of Li Tianbao (李添保)
 Vietnam
 Diên Ninh (延寧, 1454–1459): Later Lê dynasty — era name of Lê Nhân Tông
 Thiên Hưng (天興 or 天與, 1459–1460): Later Lê dynasty — era name of Lê Nghi Dân
 Quang Thuận (光順, 1460–1469): Later Lê dynasty — era name of Lê Thánh Tông
 Japan
 Kōshō (康正, 1455–1457): era name of Emperor Go-Hanazono
 Chōroku (長禄, 1457–1460): era name of Emperor Go-Hanazono
 Kanshō (寛正, 1460–1466): era name of Emperor Go-Hanazono and Emperor Go-Tsuchimikado

See also
 List of Chinese era names
 List of Ming dynasty era names

References

Further reading

Ming dynasty eras